Tabriz meatballs, also known as koofteh Tabrizi, are a variety of Iranian meatballs from the city of Tabriz. The dish normally consists of a large meatball including rice, yellow split peas, herbs and other ingredients, and its juice which is served in a separate dish with shredded sangak or lavash bread before the main course.

Preparation
The ingredients are ground beef, rice, yellow split peas, leeks, mint, parsley, onion and spices, wrapped around a core of boiled egg, walnut, fried onion and dried apricot. The kufteh are braised along with fried onions, tomato paste and barberries.

Some versions are wrapped around a small stuffed bird before stewing.

Etymology
Kufteh Tabrizi means 'meatball of Tabriz'. The word is derived from kūfteh: in Persian, kuftan (کوفتن) means 'to beat' or 'to grind'.

See also 
Iranian cuisine
Azerbaijani cuisine
Sulu köfte
Ciorbă de perişoare
Smyrna meatballs
Yuvarlak
Harput meatballs
 List of soups
 List of meatball dishes

References 

Kofta
Iranian cuisine
Azerbaijani cuisine
Meatballs